James Thomas Begg (February 16, 1877 – March 26, 1963) was an American educator and politician who served five terms as a U.S. Representative from Ohio from 1919 to 1929.

Biography
Born on a farm near Lima, Ohio, Begg attended the public and high schools of Columbus Grove, and Lima (Ohio) College.
He was graduated from the Wooster (Ohio) University in 1903.
He taught school.
Superintendent of public schools at Columbus Grove, Ohio 1905–1910, at Ironton, Ohio from 1910 to 1913, and at Sandusky, Ohio from 1913 to 1917.
He was employed as a campaign director and lectured throughout the United States for the American City Bureau of New York in chamber-of-commerce work 1917–1919.

Congress 
Begg was elected as a Republican to the Sixty-sixth and to the four succeeding Congresses (March 4, 1919 – March 3, 1929).
He was not a candidate for renomination in 1928 to the Seventy-first Congress.
He engaged in the banking business.
He was an unsuccessful candidate for election in 1942 to the Seventy-eighth Congress.
Business consultant and dairy farmer.

Later career and death 
He moved to Oklahoma City, Oklahoma, in 1959, where he resided until his death on March 26, 1963.
He was interred in Garfield-Lakeview Cemetery, Cleveland, Ohio.

Sources

1877 births
1963 deaths
Politicians from Lima, Ohio
Politicians from Sandusky, Ohio
College of Wooster alumni
Burials at Lake View Cemetery, Cleveland
American bankers
People from Columbus Grove, Ohio
Oklahoma Republicans
Republican Party members of the United States House of Representatives from Ohio